Dana Snyder is an American actor. He is known for his voice roles of Master Shake in Aqua Teen Hunger Force, Granny Cuyler in Squidbillies, Baby Ball on Ballmastrz: 9009, and other roles in various Adult Swim television shows. His other voice roles include voicing  Gazpacho in Cartoon Network's animated series Chowder, Dr. Colosso in Nickelodeon's comedy series The Thundermans, and Scratch in Disney Channel's animated series The Ghost and Molly McGee. His live-action television show work has been in shows such as Saul of the Mole Men and Your Pretty Face is Going to Hell.

Early life
Snyder was born in Allentown, Pennsylvania and grew up in Las Vegas, Nevada. He credits Don Rickles, Rip Taylor, and Phil Silvers as childhood influences in his decision to pursue acting. Snyder graduated from Las Vegas High School in 1992 and from Webster University in St. Louis in 1996 with a BFA from Webster's Conservatory of Theatre Arts.

Career

Voice acting
Snyder was hired to voice Master Shake on Aqua Teen Hunger Force, auditioning over the phone in a call with Dave Willis, the show's co-creator. Snyder played the vocal role of Gazpacho on Chowder, Dr. Wang on Minoriteam, The Alchemist and The President on The Venture Bros., Baby Ball on Ballmastrz: 9009, and Granny Cuyler on Squidbillies. He voices Todd and Benny Lee on the G4TV show Code Monkeys, Leonard the Koala in The Penguins of Madagascar, and plays a teacher named "Mr. Baldwin" on the Disney series Fish Hooks.

He played Alistair in Open Season 3.

Snyder provided the voices of Sam and that of Cold Fusion Reactor Dad on the web series Suicide by Side. He narrated the Adult Swim web series Sipes Stories that he co-produced with Andy Sipes. He has starred on Adventure Time as the Ancient Sleeping Magi of Life Giving from the episode "Little Dude" in the fifth season. He played the voice of Belcitane within the White Knight Chronicles, and the White Knight Chronicles II.
He also shows up in the web series "Bravest Warriors" in season 2 episode 6.

He voices the recurring character McSweats in the Disney XD animated series Pickle and Peanut. Snyder played Dr. Colosso on Nickelodeon's comedy The Thundermans from 2013 to 2018 where he voiced his rabbit form and portrayed his human form. He also played as Graballa the Hutt on the Disney XD animated series Lego Star Wars: The Freemaker Adventures.

In 2021, Snyder appeared as Patrick Star's grandfather on The Patrick Star Show and in the role of Scratch the ghost on The Ghost and Molly McGee.

Stage acting
On April 15, 2010, Snyder and Dave Willis went on a multi-city tour called Aqua Teen Hunger Force Live!. In June 2010, he appeared as Max Bialystock in the Arrow Rock Lyceum Theatre's production of Mel Brooks' The Producers in Arrow Rock, Missouri. In February and March 2011, he again played Max Bialystock in The Producers at the Riverside Theatre in Vero Beach, Florida. Snyder has also been seen in the Lyceum Theatre 2011 productions of Run For Your Wife, Damn Yankees, and The Sound of Music and has worked at several other United States regional theaters, including Repertory Theatre of St. Louis, Cincinnati Playhouse in the Park, and Cleveland Play House. Snyder was also a guest performer during several performances of the Atlanta-based burlesque revue "Dames Aflame" in 2010 and 2012.

Film and television
Snyder has made guest appearances on ER, Brothers and Sisters, and Gary Unmarried. Snyder also appeared in Saul of the Mole Men, The Young Person's Guide to History, and Your Pretty Face is Going to Hell. He guest appeared on the Christian live action television show Come On Over.

Podcasts
Snyder co-hosted the Ken P.D. Snydecast with Ken "Plumey" Plume, which was a free podcast. The first episode of the show appeared on the internet on January 11, 2006, with the last episode appearing September 18, 2017. The show was initially produced out of IGN and was produced out of Fred Entertainment before its finale in 2017. In addition to Snyder and Plume, guests have included Doc Hammer, Paul Sabourin, and Jay Wade Edwards. In late 2013, Dana began co-hosting the podcast Drunk on Disney with Guy Hutchinson.
Since 2018, Snyder started hosting Dino and Dana's Safe Space Starring Spencer and Tish with Dino Stamatopoulos, Spencer Crittenden and Tish Burns. Occasional guests include Jeff B. Davis and Cassandra Church. As of January 2021, Dino and Dana’s Safe Space no longer stars Spencer or Tish and exclusively streams on Patreon. Podcast regulars now include Lisa Corrao (comedian), and duo, Bob and Ron (of Chicago’s own Bob and Ron’s Record Club).

Personal life

He married Christine "Sweety" Snyder (née Ciccone) in August 2005. They have one daughter born in June 2014.

Filmography

Film

Television

Video games

Live-action

Other

References

External links

 
 
 Dana Snyder at Fanpop.com
 Dana Snyder interview, February 24, 2006
 Dana Snyder interview on The Swimcast: Part one and Part two

Living people
21st-century American comedians
American stand-up comedians
Television producers from Pennsylvania
American male video game actors
American male voice actors
Las Vegas High School alumni
Male actors from Allentown, Pennsylvania
Webster University alumni
Year of birth missing (living people)